Stéphane Crête (September 19, 1967) is a Canadian actor and comedian from Quebec. He is known for his roles as Brad Spitfire in the Le Canal Famille television show Dans une galaxie près de chez-vous and Jacques Préfontaine on the Télévision de Radio-Canada miniseries Les Étoiles filantes.

In 2002, he won a Gémeaux Award for his work in Dans une galaxie près de chez-vous

References

Further reading

External links

Canadian male television actors
Living people
1967 births
French Quebecers
Male actors from Quebec